Luca Birigozzi (born 24 April 1960 in Milan) is an Italian former footballer who played as a midfielder. He made 170 appearances in the Italian professional leagues, and played for three seasons (31 games, 2 goals) in Serie A with Roma and Pisa.

References

1960 births
Living people
Italian footballers
Association football midfielders
Ternana Calcio players
A.S. Roma players
Pisa S.C. players
A.S. Sambenedettese players
Benevento Calcio players
A.S.D. SolbiaSommese Calcio players
Serie A players
Serie B players